Amida Abiola Brimah (born February 11, 1994) is a Ghanaian professional basketball player for JL Bourg of the French LNB Pro A. He played college basketball for the UConn Huskies.

College career
Brimah was on the Huskies' 2013–14 NCAA Championship team.  In the first round of the tournament, vs St. Joe's, UConn trailed 67–70 with 39 seconds remaining when Brimah rebounded a missed shot and converted a 3 point play to send the game to overtime; UConn ultimately won the game in overtime. Brimah's play was cited as a turning point in UConn's title run.

On December 15, 2014, he scored 40 points in a game against Coppin State, becoming the 11th Husky to do so. Brimah's 13-13 shooting led Connecticut to a 106–85 victory. At the conclusion of the season, he was named honorable mention all conference.

In his career at UConn, Brimah averaged 6.7 points and 4.5 rebounds.

Professional career

Austin Spurs (2017–2018)
After going undrafted in 2017 NBA Draft, Brimah signed with the Chicago Bulls to play in the 2017 Summer League. On September 25, 2017, Brimah was included in the training camp roster of the San Antonio Spurs. He was later on waived on October 12, 2017. On November 2, 2017, Brimah was included in the 2017–18 opening night roster for Austin Spurs.

Partizan (2018)
On April 13, 2018, Brimah signed with Partizan.

Return to Austin (2018–2019)
On September 18, 2018, Brimah signed an Exhibit 10 deal with the San Antonio Spurs, but was waived by the Spurs three days later. On October 22, 2018, Brimah was included in the training camp roster of the Austin Spurs, and on October 31, Brimah was included in Austin's opening night roster.

On August 30, 2019, the Fort Wayne Mad Ants had acquired the returning right of Brimah from the Austin Spurs in exchange for the returning right to Jordan Barnett. On September 3, 2019, Brimah signed an Exhibit 10 contract with the Indiana Pacers. On October 16, 2019, Brimah was waived by the Indiana Pacers.

Fort Wayne Mad Ants / Indiana Pacers (2021)
On November 21, 2020, Brimah signed an exhibit-10 contract with the Pacers, re-joining the team. On December 18, 2020, Brimah was waived by the Pacers. On January 11, 2021, he was included in the single site season roster by the Fort Wayne Mad Ants, where he played 10 games and averaged 8.0 points, 8.5 rebounds and 2.8 blocks in 23.5 minutes.

On April 23, 2021, Brimah signed a two-way deal with the Pacers. He played five games for the Pacers, averaging 2.6 points and 1.6 rebounds in 5.8 minutes per game. In 10 games for the G League Mad Ants, he averaged 8 points, 8.6 rebounds and 2.6 blocks per game. Brimah was waived shortly before training camp the next season.

Mets de Guaynabo (2021)
On September 9, 2021, Brimah signed with the Mets de Guaynabo of the Baloncesto Superior Nacional. In 22 games, he averaged 11.6 points, 9.6 rebounds and 3.0 blocks per game.

Filou Oostende (2021–2022)
On November 12, 2021, Brimah signed with Filou Oostende of the BNXT League and the Basketball Champions League.
After an injury (broken foot) he is able to join his team for the finals of the play-offs. Filou Oostende can become for the 11th time in a row the national Belgian champions.

JL Bourg (2022–2023)
On November 8, 2022, he signed with JL Bourg of the French LNB Pro A.

Career statistics

NBA

|-
| style="text-align:left;"| 
| style="text-align:left;"| Indiana
| 5 || 0 || 5.8 || .625 || — || 1.000 || 1.6 || .2 || .0 || 1.0 || 2.6
|- class="sortbottom"
| style="text-align:center;" colspan="2"| Career
| 5 || 0 || 5.8 || .625 || — || 1.000 || 1.6 || .2 || .0 || 1.0 || 2.6

College

|-
| style="text-align:left;"| 2013–14
| style="text-align:left;"| Connecticut
| 40 || 17 || 16.2 || .640 || .000 || .574 || 3.0 || .3 || .1 || 2.3 || 4.1
|-
| style="text-align:left;"| 2014–15
| style="text-align:left;"| Connecticut
| 35 || 35 || 26.3 || .674 || .000 || .650 || 4.4 || .2 || .2 || 3.5 || 9.1
|-
| style="text-align:left;"| 2015–16
| style="text-align:left;"| Connecticut
| 25 || 17 || 21.0 || .663 || .000 || .824 || 4.6 || .1 || .2 || 2.7 || 6.5
|-
| style="text-align:left;"| 2016–17
| style="text-align:left;"| Connecticut
| 33 || 33 || 24.7 || .573 || .000 || .623 || 6.1 || .2 || .2 || 2.6 || 7.6
|-
| style="text-align:left;"| Career
| style="text-align:left;"| 
| 133 || 102 || 21.9 || .637 || .000 || .644 || 4.5 || .2 || .2 || 2.8 || 6.7
|-

See also
 List of foreign basketball players in Serbia

References

External links
UConn Huskies bio
RealGM profile

1994 births
Living people
Austin Spurs players
Basketball League of Serbia players
Centers (basketball)
Fort Wayne Mad Ants players
Ghanaian emigrants to the United States
Ghanaian expatriate basketball people in Serbia
Ghanaian expatriate sportspeople in the United States
Ghanaian men's basketball players
Indiana Pacers players
JL Bourg-en-Bresse players
KK Partizan players
Sportspeople from Accra
UConn Huskies men's basketball players
Undrafted National Basketball Association players